Roquefort-Les-Pins is a commune in the Alpes-Maritimes department in the Provence-Alpes-Côte d'Azur region in southeastern France.

Economy and industry
Shops: grocery stores, hair salons, office, pharmacies, newsagents, hardware, nursery. 
Industry:  personal services. Hotels and restaurants. Petrol stations. Real estate agencies, expert surveyor. Medical center, dentist, podiatrist, speech therapists, nurses. Post office (La Poste). College, Primary School and nursery care. Religious private school. Cinema. Library. Hall. Stables. Sports center (large multi-sport gym hall, skate park) . assorted associations and clubs. Firefighters and police. Football and tennis club with artificial pitches and courts.

Situation and development
The village is situated between 200 and 300 metres above sea level. Roquefort-Les-Pins is surrounded by a pine forest and rocky landscape, making it a picturesque Cote D'azur village. The river Miagne is situated to the north of the commune, running parallel to the D7 national road. The commune is cut into 4 zones expanding from the center: A heavily forested zone, a sparsely populated zone, a moderately populated zone and a densely populated zone.

During the past decade, to help satisfy a growing population, the town has invested in several new developments and improvements to community services and buildings, these include:

-extension and renovation of the primary school
-creating a sports complex (stadium, tennis courts)
-creating a sports area (track, basketball court)
-establishment of a college
-creation of a skate park
-creation of a town centre (in progress)
-implementation of social housing 
-development of a village centre with housing (in progress)
-creation of a health centre (planned)
-expansion of the town hall (in progress)
-beautification of the main axis
-reconstruction of the fire station (planned)
-modernisation of the canteen

Public transport
The town is served by various bus lines that lead to nearby villages such as Valbonne and Sophia Antipolis

Population

See also
Communes of the Alpes-Maritimes department

References

External links

Mairie website

Communes of Alpes-Maritimes
Alpes-Maritimes communes articles needing translation from French Wikipedia